The 2001 Speedway World Cup Qualification (SWC) was two events of motorcycle speedway meetings used to determine the four national teams who qualify for the 2001 Speedway World Cup.

Results

Heat details

Ljubljana (1) 
Preliminary round 1
 3 June 2001
  Ljubljana
 Referee: ?

Debrecen (2) 
Preliminary round 2
 3 June 2001
  Debrecen
 Referee: ?

See also 
 Motorcycle speedway

References 

Q